Charis Kopitsis (born 5 March 1969) is a former Greek professional footballer and manager. He is the Director of Football at Egaleo.

Club career
Kopitsis started his career in 1984 at Orfeas Aigaleo and in the summer of 1986 he was moved to Egaleo. He played there for a season and a half, competing in the second and third division.

In December of 1987 he was transferred to Panionios, where he gradually earned a starting position the following season, when the team reached the final of the Greek Cup in 1989. However, he did not play in the final. He was transferred to AEK Athens in December 1992.

He played mainly as a right back, but also as a right midfielder. In his many years of career in AEK, he was a key player and a substitute player at other times, but he always had an active participation in the team. He had remarkable performance in April 1993 at the crucial home derby against Panathinaikos, where he unleashed a firebolt and made the final 3–1 for AEK, he even saw a red card because he took off his shirt in celebration. In January 1994 he also had a great performance against the same opponent scoring the first of the 2 goals, with a power shot, that led AEK to win the match and eventually the title. Kopitsis won 2 championships, 3 cups and 1 Super Cup with AEK before leaving the club in 2001.

He returned to Egaleo and the following season to Panionios. However, he did not manage to find a starting position and moved to Panelefsiniakos in the fourth division, where he ended his career at the end of the season.

After football
Kopitsis started working at the AEK academies. In April 2016, he was also elected a member of the Board of Directors of Amateur AEK. From 2020 he is the Director of Football at Egaleo and at the same time he worked as a coach at Akratitos.

Honours

AEK Athens
Alpha Ethniki: 1992–93, 1993–94
Greek Cup: 1995–96, 1996–97, 1999–2000
Greek Super Cup: 1996

References

1969 births
Living people
Association football fullbacks
AEK Athens F.C. players
Panionios F.C. players
Egaleo F.C. players
AEK F.C. non-playing staff
Panelefsiniakos F.C. players
Super League Greece players
Footballers from Athens
Greek footballers